Dylan McCord (born July 18, 1998), known professionally as D. Savage (formerly known as D. Savage 3900), is an American rapper and songwriter from Los Angeles, California.

Career
In 2016, he became notorious in the SoundCloud scene with his track "30 Round Clip".  In June 2017, he released his single "Emotionless". In February 2018, he released his single "Kame In" alongside a music video. In August 2018, he appeared on American record producer Ron-Ron's track "Pull Up". In October 2018, he released his mixtape D Phoenix with appearances from Lil Yachty, Ty Dolla $ign and Yung Bans. In December 2019, he released his single "Nobody's Safe" alongside a music video. In November 2021, he released his album BPL with appearances from Trippie Redd, Lil Gnar, Matt Ox, K Suave and Tony Shhnow. In May 2022, he featured on Flash Gottii's song "Pull Up" and its accompanying music video.

References

External links 
 

Living people
1998 births
American male rappers
Rappers from New York (state)
Rappers from Los Angeles